Uchquduq (sometimes spelled as Uchkuduk,) is a city in the north of Navoiy Region, Uzbekistan. It is the seat of Uchquduq District. The city's name means "three draw-wells" in Uzbek. Its population is 26,800 (2016).

History
Uchkuduk was founded in 1958, after a small prospecting party found deposits of uranium ore.  In the late 1960s, the development of open pit and underground mining led to the rapid growth of the settlement, with workers, engineers and technicians from all over the Soviet Union. It was elevated to city status in 1978. Until 1979, Uchkuduk had the status of a "closed secret city," as it supplied much of the raw material for nuclear weapons in the Soviet military arsenal. The mining operations are now under the control of the Navoi Mining and Metallurgy Combinat (NMMC), which continues to mine and process uranium using in-situ leach processes. The company also produces gold by the same process.

Aeroflot Flight 7425 crashed near Uchkuduk on July 10, 1985.

The Uzbek group Yalla made a Soviet-wide hit named after the city.

References 

Populated places in Navoiy Region
Cities in Uzbekistan
Uranium mines in the Soviet Union
Mining in Uzbekistan
Nuclear weapons program of the Soviet Union
Cities and towns built in the Soviet Union
Closed cities